SL-4 may refer to:

The Voskhod rocket, type 11A57, primarily used between 1963-1966
The Soyuz rocket, type 11A511, used from 1966-present